Willem Hendrik "Willy" de Vos (26 January 1880 – 15 July 1957) was a Dutch footballer who played in the Netherlands' first ever international match on 30 April 1905. De Vos, who played club football for DFC, made a total of two appearances for the national side in 1905.

External links
 Profile at VoetbalStats.nl

1880 births
1957 deaths
Dutch footballers
Netherlands international footballers
People from Bernisse
Association footballers not categorized by position
Footballers from South Holland